Taebla Parish was a rural municipality in Lääne County, Estonia, that existed from 1992 to 2013.

After the municipal elections held on 20 October 2013, Taebla Parish was merged with neighbouring Oru and Risti parishes and a new Lääne-Nigula Parish was established.

In 2008 it had a population of 2,911 and an area of 141 km².

Populated places
Taebla Parish had 2 small boroughs (Palivere and Taebla) and 15 villages: Allikmaa, Kadarpiku, Kedre, Kirimäe, Koela, Leediküla, Luigu, Nigula, Nihka, Pälli, Tagavere, Turvalepa, Väänla, Vidruka and Võntküla.

References

This article includes content from the Estonian Wikipedia article Taebla vald.

External links
 

Former municipalities of Estonia
Geography of Lääne County